Talia Fowler is a dancer who won the 2009 season of So You Think You Can Dance Australia.

Born in Brisbane, Queensland, Fowler started ballet and jazz dance at the age of three. After entering the Queensland Ballet, she stayed there for three years, being the youngest student ever to have been there.

Fowler left the company to enter SYTYCD to go after other styles. There, she beat favourite Charlie Bartley, Dubbo, to become the first female dancer to win So You Think You Can Dance Australia. After So You Think You Can Dance, she toured in the Australian production of Fame the musical alongside her past competitors Timomatic and Amy Campbell.

References

External links

Australian female dancers
People from Brisbane
So You Think You Can Dance Australia contestants
So You Think You Can Dance winners
Living people
Year of birth missing (living people)